California School of Podiatric Medicine at Samuel Merritt University is a podiatric medical school based in Oakland, California.  It is one of eleven podiatric medical schools in the United States. The college is accredited by the American Podiatric Medical Association's Council on Podiatric Medical Education.

History
The school was founded in 1914 as the California School of Chiropody and was located in San Francisco.  In 1969, the name was changed to the California College of Podiatric Medicine.  In 2002, the college underwent a merger with Samuel Merritt University in Oakland and the school was renamed to be the California School of Podiatric Medicine (CSPM).

Until 2009, when Western University opened its College of Podiatric Medicine in Pomona, CSPM was the only podiatric medical school in the western United States. For this reason, most podiatric physicians in that part of the country attended CSPM.

Academics
The educational program leading to the Doctor of Podiatric Medicine degree consists of a comprehensive curriculum in the basic medical and clinical sciences. The didactic course work is completed during the first three years of the program. Clinical rotations begin at the start of the second academic year in May. During the summer months, second year students begin to participate in clinical rotations, which cover mechanical orthopedics/biomechanics, radiology, general and primary podiatric medicine. The majority of the third year and the entire fourth year are devoted to clinical rotations at inpatient and outpatient facilities, outside externships at affiliated Bay Area medical centers and throughout the United States, and community practice clerkships.  In addition to podiatric medicine and surgery, students are exposed to internal medicine, vascular surgery, general surgery, orthopedics surgery, rheumatology, anesthesia, dermatology, trauma, infectious disease, and other medical fields.

Students, who successfully complete the four year podiatric medical curriculum, take and pass the 3rd Year Practical Examinations, the 4th Year Objective Structured Clinical Examination (OSCE) Examination, Parts I and II of the National Board of Podiatric Medical Examiners, and receive approval for graduation by the appropriate administration and faculty may be granted the degree of Doctor of Podiatric Medicine.

CSPM has a local learning center at St. Mary's Medical Center in San Francisco.  In addition to St. Mary's, major hospital affiliations include Seton Medical Center, Alameda County Medical Center - Highland Hospital, Laguna Honda Hospital and Rehabilitation Center, Kaiser Permanente San Francisco, San Francisco General Hospital, VA San Francisco Medical Center, and VA Palo Alto Health Care System.  In addition, fourth year students have the opportunity to do core rotations at VA Albuquerque Medical Center, Maricopa Medical Center in Arizona, VA Salt Lake City, VA Tacoma/Madigan Army Hospital, or Long Beach Memorial Medical Center.

References

External links
California School of Podiatric Medicine Website
Samuel Merritt University

External links 
 Official website

Educational institutions established in 1909
Education in Oakland, California
Podiatric medical schools in the United States
Universities and colleges in Alameda County, California
Schools accredited by the Western Association of Schools and Colleges
1909 establishments in California